Divine Design is the fourth album by hip hop artist Jeru the Damaja. It is produced by Ed Dantez and Luis "Sabor" Tineo as opposed Jeru's earlier albums which were produced by DJ Premier and Jeru himself.

Album information
It was not a critical success contrasting with Jeru's first two albums and similar to Heroz4Hire, it did not chart or have any charting singles. It features no guest appearances and Jeru does not try promoting colleagues such as Afu-Ra and Miz Marvel on the album.

Track listing
All tracks produced by Ed Dantez, except tracks 3, 8 and 13 produced by Sabor

Samples
"Logical"
"You Don't Have to Change" by Kool & the Gang

References

2003 albums
Jeru the Damaja albums